Joanna Wiśniewska (born 24 May 1972 in Wrocław) is a discus thrower from Poland. Her personal best throw is 63.97 metres, achieved at the 1999 Summer Universiade in Palma.  She competed at the 2004 and 2008 Summer Olympics as well as five World Championships.

Competition record

References

External links
 
PZLA profile

1972 births
Living people
Sportspeople from Wrocław
Polish female discus throwers
Athletes (track and field) at the 2004 Summer Olympics
Athletes (track and field) at the 2008 Summer Olympics
Olympic athletes of Poland
European Athletics Championships medalists
Universiade medalists in athletics (track and field)
Universiade silver medalists for Poland
Medalists at the 1999 Summer Universiade